Events in the year 1907 in Iceland.

Incumbents 

 Monarch: Frederick VIII
 Prime Minister: Hannes Þórður Pétursson Hafstein

Events 

 11 March - The Íþróttafélag Reykjavíkur is established
 1 April - Ungmennafélag Bolungarvíkur is established
 The Tindastóll men's football team is established
 Ungmennafélagið Tindastóll is established
 Húsavíkurkirkja is constructed in Húsavík
 Milljónarfélagið is established in Viðey
 Frederick VIII of Denmark visits Iceland during the summer.

References 

 
1900s in Iceland
Years of the 20th century in Iceland
Iceland
Iceland